Joe Klein (born 1946) is an American journalist and columnist, known for his novel Primary Colors.

Joe Klein may also refer to:
 Joe Klein (baseball executive) (1942–2017), American executive in professional baseball

See also 
 Joe Kleine (born 1962), American basketball player
 Joseph Klein (composer) (born 1962), American composer, conductor, and educator
 Joseph Klein (1886–?), Wisconsin machinist and Socialist legislator